Nikolaos Kollias (born in Selitsa, Voio) was a Greek revolutionary and soldier.

Nikolaos Kollias took part in the 1896-1897 Greek Macedonian rebellion and enlisted in the Hellenic Army to serve in the Greco-Turkish War of 1897. He took an active part in the Macedonian Struggle and would once again volunteer for army service during the Balkan Wars.

References 

Greek military personnel of the Balkan Wars
Greek people of the Macedonian Struggle
People from Askio, Kozani
Year of birth missing
Year of death missing